Isolation Forest is an algorithm for data anomaly detection initially developed by Fei Tony Liu and Zhi-Hua Zhou in 2008. Isolation Forest detects anomalies using binary trees. The algorithm has a linear time complexity and a low memory requirement, which works well with high-volume data. 

Isolation Forest splits the data space using lines that are orthogonal to the origin and assigns higher anomaly scores to data points that need fewer splits to be isolated. The figure on the right shows an application of the Isolation Forest algorithm to the waiting time between eruptions and the duration of the eruption of the Old Faithful geyser in Yellowstone National Park. Darker shades of red indicate higher estimated anomaly scores.

History 

The Isolation Forest (iForest) algorithm was initially proposed by Fei Tony Liu, Kai Ming Ting and Zhi-Hua Zhou in 2008. In 2010, an extension of the algorithm - SCiforest  was developed to address clustered and axis-paralleled anomalies. In 2012 the same authors demonstrated that iForest has linear time complexity, a small memory requirement, and is applicable to high dimensional data. 

In 2013 Zhiguo Ding and Minrui Fei proposed a framework based on iForest to resolve the problem of detecting anomalies in streaming data. More applications of iForest to streaming data are described in papers by Tan et al., Susto et al. and Weng et al.

In 2018, an extension of iForest, aimed at improving the reliability of the anomaly score produced for a given data point was proposed.

Algorithm 

The premise of the Isolation Forest algorithm is that anomalous data points are easier to separate from the rest of the sample. In order to isolate a data point, the algorithm recursively generates partitions on the sample by randomly selecting an attribute and then randomly selecting a split value between the minimum and maximum values allowed for that attribute.

An example of random partitioning in a 2D dataset of normally distributed points is given in Fig. 2 for a non-anomalous point and Fig. 3 for a point that's more likely to be an anomaly. It is apparent from the pictures how anomalies require fewer random partitions to be isolated, compared to normal points.

Recursive partitioning can be represented by a tree structure named Isolation Tree, while the number of partitions required to isolate a point can be interpreted as the length of the path, within the tree, to reach a terminating node starting from the root.

An Isolation Tree (iTree) is defined as a data structure with the following properties:

 for each node  in the Tree,  is either an external-node with no child, or an internal-node with one “test” and exactly two child nodes ( and  )

In order to build an iTree, the algorithm recursively divides  by randomly selecting an attribute  and a split value , until either
 the node has only one instance, or
 all data at the node have the same values.

Intuitively, the anomalous points are those (easier to isolate, hence) with the smaller path length in the tree, where the path length  of point  is defined as the number of edges  traverses from the root node to get to an external node.

A probabilistic explanation of iTree is provided in the original iForest paper.

Properties of isolation forest 
 Sub-sampling: As iForest does not need to isolate all normal instances, it can frequently ignore the majority of the training sample. As a consequence, iForest works very well when the sampling size is kept small, a property that is in contrast with the great majority of existing methods, where a large sampling size is usually desirable.
 Swamping: When normal instances are too close to anomalies, the number of partitions required to separate anomalies increases, a phenomenon known as swamping, which makes it more difficult for iForest to discriminate between anomalies and normal points. One of the main reasons for swamping is the presence of too much data for the purpose of anomaly detection, which implies one possible solution to the problem is sub-sampling. Since 

 responds very well to sub-sampling in terms of performance, the reduction of the number of points in the sample is also a good way to reduce the effect of swamping.
 Masking: When the number of anomalies is high it is possible that some of those aggregate in a dense and large cluster, making it more difficult to separate the single anomalies and, in turn, to detect such points as anomalous. Similarly, to swamping, this phenomenon (known as “masking”) is also more likely when the number of points in the sample is big and can be alleviated through sub-sampling.
 High Dimensional Data: One of the main limitations of standard, distance-based methods is their inefficiency in dealing with high dimensional datasets. The main reason for that is, in a high dimensional space every point is equally sparse, so using a distance-based measure of separation is pretty ineffective.  Unfortunately, high-dimensional data also affects the detection performance of iForest, but the performance can be vastly improved by adding a features selection test, like Kurtosis, to reduce the dimensionality of the sample space.
 Normal Instances Only: iForest performs well even if the training set does not contain any anomalous point, the reason being that iForest describes data distributions in such a way that high values of the path length  correspond to the presence of data points. As a consequence, the presence of anomalies is pretty irrelevant to iForest's detection performance.

Anomaly detection with isolation forest 
Anomaly detection with Isolation Forest is a process composed of two main stages:

 in the first stage, a training dataset is used to build iTrees.
 in the second stage, each instance in the test set is passed through these iTrees, and a proper “anomaly score” is assigned to the instance.

Once all the instances in the test set have been assigned an anomaly score, it is possible to mark as “anomaly” any point whose score is greater than a predefined threshold, which depends on the domain the analysis is being applied to.

Anomaly score 
The algorithm for computing the anomaly score of a data point is based on the observation that the structure of iTrees is equivalent to that of Binary Search Trees (BST): a termination to an external node of the iTree corresponds to an unsuccessful search in the BST. As a consequence, the estimation of average  for external node terminations is the same as that of the unsuccessful searches in BST, that is

The value of c(m) above represents the average of  given , so we can use it to normalize  and get an estimation of the anomaly score for a given instance x:

It is interesting to note that for any given instance :
 if  is close to  then  is very likely to be an anomaly
 if  is smaller than  then  is likely to be a normal value

Open source implementations 

Original implementation:

  Isolation Forest, an algorithm that detects data-anomalies using binary trees written in R. Released by the paper's first author Liu, Fei Tony in 2009.

Other implementations (in alphabetical order):

 Isolation Forest - A Spark/Scala implementation, created by James Verbus from the LinkedIn Anti-Abuse AI team.
 Isolation Forest by H2O-3 - An implementation of Isolation Forest for Anomaly Detection by H2O-3.
 Package solitude implementation in R by Srikanth Komala Sheshachala.
 Python implementation with examples in scikit-learn.
 Spark iForest - A distributed implementation in Scala and Python, which runs on Apache Spark. Written by Yang, Fangzhou.
 PyOD IForest - Another Python implementation in the popular Python Outlier Detection (PyOD) library.

Other variations of Isolation Forest algorithm implementations:

 Extended Isolation Forest – An implementation of Extended Isolation Forest for Anomaly Detection by Sahand Hariri.
	
 Extended Isolation Forest by H2O-3 - An implementation of Extended Isolation Forest for Anomaly Detection by H2O-3.

 (Python, R, C/C++) Isolation Forest and variations by David Cortes - An implementation of Isolation Forest and its variations by David Cortes.

See also 
 Anomaly detection
 Random forest

References 

Unsupervised learning
Statistical outliers